Tinagma dryadis is a moth of the  family Douglasiidae. It was described by Staudinger in 1872. It is found in Scandinavia, northern Russia, France, Switzerland, Austria and Italy.

The wingspan is 7–8 mm. Adults are on wing in July.

The larvae feed on Dryas octopetala.

References

Moths described in 1872
Douglasiidae
Moths of Europe